Shannonvale may refer to:

 Shannonvale, County Cork, a village in Ireland
 Shannonvale, County Tipperary, a townland in Tipperary near Dromineer, Ireland
 Shannonvale, New Brunswick, a community in Canada
 Shannonvale, Queensland,  rural locality in Australia